The 1964 United States presidential election in New Hampshire took place on November 5, 1964, as part of the 1964 United States presidential election, which was held throughout all 50 states and D.C. Voters chose four representatives, or electors to the Electoral College, who voted for president and vice president.

New Hampshire was won overwhelmingly by the Democratic nominees, incumbent President Lyndon B. Johnson of Texas and his running mate Senator Hubert H. Humphrey of Minnesota. Johnson and Humphrey defeated the Republican nominees, Senator Barry Goldwater of Arizona and his running mate Congressman William E. Miller of New York.

Johnson took 63.89% of the vote to Goldwater’s 36.11%, a margin of 27.78%.

The staunch conservative Barry Goldwater was widely perceived in the liberal Northeastern United States as a right-wing extremist; he had voted against the Civil Rights Act of 1964, and the Johnson campaign portrayed him as a warmonger who as president would provoke a nuclear war. Thus Goldwater performed especially weakly in liberal northeastern states like New Hampshire, and for the first time in history, a Democratic presidential candidate swept every Northeastern state in 1964. Not only did Johnson win every Northeastern state, but he won all of them with landslides of over 60% of the vote, including New Hampshire.

Despite the scale of Johnson’s statewide win, he did not sweep every county in New Hampshire. Carroll County had long been the most Republican county in New Hampshire, voting over 70% Republican in 1960 and over 80% Republican in 1952 and 1956. In 1964, Carroll County would again be the most Republican county in the state, voting 55–45 for Goldwater even as every other county in the state voted decisively for Johnson. Carroll County was not only the only county carried by Goldwater in New Hampshire, it was the only county Goldwater won in all of New England and the Northeastern United States outside of Pennsylvania. Despite the landslide loss, New Hampshire would prove to be Goldwater’s strongest state in the Northeast.

Johnson won the remainder of the state by decisive margins, with his strongest victories in the New Deal Democratic base counties of Hillsborough County, Strafford County, and Coös County, which had long been Democratic counties in an otherwise Republican state, even as the rest of the state finally joined them in voting Democratic in 1964. This was the first time Sullivan County had voted for a Democratic presidential candidate since Franklin D. Roosevelt in 1944, the first time Belknap, Grafton, Merrimack and Rockingham Counties had voted Democratic since Woodrow Wilson in 1912 when the GOP was mortally divided, and the first time Cheshire County had voted Democratic since voting for New Hampshire native Franklin Pierce in 1852.

Johnson’s strongest victory was in rural, French-Canadian Coös County in the far north of the state, which Johnson won with 71.1% of the vote.

This would be the last occasion until 2008 that a Democratic presidential nominee would carry Belknap County, and the last until 1996 that the party's nominee would carry Rockingham County. New Hampshire as a whole, along with Cheshire, Grafton, Merrimack and Sullivan Counties, would not vote Democratic again until 1992.

As Johnson won a decisive nationwide landslide with 61.05% of the vote, normally Republican-leaning New Hampshire’s results made the state over 5% more Democratic than the national average in the 1964 election. Only in the 1920 Republican landslide, when the state was James M. Cox’s second-best antebellum free state despite being lost by 20%, has New Hampshire voted more Democratic relative to the nation. As of 2020, this remains the last time that a Democratic presidential nominee would carry New Hampshire by double-digits.

Results

Results by county

See also
 Presidency of Lyndon B. Johnson
 United States presidential elections in New Hampshire

Notes

References

1964
New Hamp
1964 New Hampshire elections